The 2017 Nottingham Open (known for sponsorship reasons as the Aegon Open Nottingham) was a professional tennis tournament played on outdoor grass courts. It was the 10th edition of the event for women and the 22nd edition for men, with the men's event being downgraded from an ATP World Tour 250 series event to an ATP Challenger Tour event in 2017. It was classified as a WTA International tournament on the 2017 WTA Tour. The event took place at the Nottingham Tennis Centre in Nottingham, United Kingdom from 12 June through 18 June 2017.

ATP challenger singles main-draw entrants

Seeds

 1 Rankings are as of 29 May 2017.

Other entrants
The following players received wildcards into the main draw:
  Liam Broady
  Jay Clarke
  Brydan Klein
  Cameron Norrie

The following player received entry into the singles main draw using a protected ranking:
  Yuki Bhambri

The following players received entry from the qualifying draw:
  Ričardas Berankis
  Lloyd Glasspool
  Sam Groth
  John-Patrick Smith

The following player received entry as a lucky loser:
  Alex De Minaur

ATP challenger doubles main-draw entrants

Seeds

1 Rankings are as of 29 May 2017.

Other entrants
The following pairs received wildcards into the doubles main draw:
  Luke Bambridge /  Cameron Norrie
  Scott Clayton /  Jonny O'Mara
  Brydan Klein /  Joe Salisbury

WTA singles main-draw entrants

Seeds

 1 Rankings are as of 29 May 2017.

Other entrants
The following players received wildcards into the main draw:
 Tara Moore
 Laura Robson
 Heather Watson

The following player received entry using a protected ranking:
 Magdaléna Rybáriková

The following players received entry from the qualifying draw:
 Kristie Ahn
 Jana Fett
 Elizaveta Kulichkova
 Tereza Martincová
 Grace Min
 Dayana Yastremska

Withdrawals
Before the tournament
  Ekaterina Alexandrova →replaced by  Kurumi Nara
  Nao Hibino →replaced by  Hsieh Su-wei
  Yulia Putintseva →replaced by  Magdaléna Rybáriková

Retirements
  Tara Moore (left foot injury)

WTA doubles main-draw entrants

Seeds

1 Rankings are as of 29 May 2017.

Other entrants
The following pair received a wildcard into the doubles main draw:
  Freya Christie /  Tara Moore

The following pair received entry as alternates:
  Hsieh Su-wei /  Magda Linette

Withdrawals
Before the tournament
  Tara Moore (left foot injury)

Champions

Men's singles

  Dudi Sela def.  Thomas Fabbiano 4–6, 6–4, 6–3.

Women's singles

  Donna Vekić def.  Johanna Konta, 2–6, 7–6(7–3), 7–5

Men's doubles

  Ken Skupski /  Neal Skupski def.  Matt Reid /  John-Patrick Smith 7–6(7–1), 2–6, [10–7].

Women's doubles

  Monique Adamczak /  Storm Sanders def.  Jocelyn Rae /  Laura Robson, 6–4, 4–6, [10–4]

References

External links
 Website

2017 WTA Tour
2017 ATP Challenger Tour
2017
2017 in English tennis
June 2017 sports events in the United Kingdom
2017 Nottingham Open